The 1996–97 Hong Kong First Division League season was the 86th since its establishment. The season began on 7 September 1996 and ended on 8 June 1997.

First stage

Second stage

Final

References
 www.rsssf.com Hongkong 1996/97

Hong Kong First Division League seasons
Hong Kong First Division League, 1996–97
First Division